CCDI Group is a Chinese multinational architecture and engineering consulting firm that provides integrated professional services for urban construction and development headquartered in Shanghai. Its business units cover broad industry sectors with diverse specialized expertise. CCDI operates cross-regionally with offices in Shanghai, Beijing, Shenzhen, Chengdu, Sydney, New York City, Qingdao, and Suzhou with branches and representative offices in Chongqing, Nanjing and twenty other cities in China. Over the years, CCDI has established strong client relationships with most major developers, enterprises, and city governments. Founded in 1994, CCDI is a subsidiary of the privately owned construction and engineering firm, China State Construction Engineering Corporation (CSEC).

From 1994 to 2002, CCDI's work focused on the south China market, working on residential projects and public facilities such as exhibition halls and sports arenas. But, in 2003, CCDI and a consortium of other firms, won an architectural competition with the innovative design of the Beijing National Aquatics Center which was constructed for the 2008 Summer Olympics. Since then, CCDI has experienced substantial growth.

In 2013, CCDI acquired PTW Architects, a privately owned Australian-based architectural firm with expanding business interests in China and Southeast Asia.

CCDI employs more than thousand architects, engineers, planners, project managers as well as design and management consultants to offer various critical services of strategic planning, design, development, construction, and operations related to buildings, transportation, and industries.

Selected projects
Beijing National Aquatics Center (2007)
Beijing Olympic Green Tennis Center (2007)
National Tennis Center
Ping'an Financial Center
 Shanghai Rockbund Reconstruction Project
 Jinan Olympic Center
 Hangzhou Olympic Center
 Dameisha Vanke Center
 Tencent Headquarters
 Alibaba Headquarters
 Baidu Headquarters
 Harbin West Railway Station
 Beijing Kunlun Apartment
 Shenzhen City Crossing Complex
 Tianjin Cruise Terminal
 Shanghai International Tourism Resorts

References

External links
CCDI Architects: Designing China's Future by Victoria Mulgrave (2008 Images Publishing)

Government-owned companies of China
Construction and civil engineering companies of China
Architecture firms of China
Companies based in Shanghai
Chinese companies established in 1994
Construction and civil engineering companies established in 1994
1994 establishments in China